Boniface of Tuscany may refer to:
Boniface I, Margrave of Tuscany (died 823), governor of Italy under Charlemagne after the death of King Pepin
Boniface II, Margrave of Tuscany (died c. 838), count and duke of Lucca
Boniface, Count of Bologna (died c. 1011), Count of Bologna and Margrave of Tuscany
Boniface III, Margrave of Tuscany (c. 985 – May 6, 1052), father of Matilda of Canossa and the most powerful north Italian prince of his age